Myxine  is a genus of hagfish, from the Greek μυξῖνος (myxinos, "slimy").

In 2021, three new species of Myxine were described from the Galápagos including M. phantasma, the only species of Myxine to not have melanin-based pigments.

Species 
 Myxine affinis Günther, 1870 (Patagonian hagfish)
 Myxine australis Jenyns, 1842 (southern hagfish)
 Myxine capensis Regan, 1913 (Cape hagfish)
 Myxine circifrons Garman, 1899 (whiteface hagfish)
 Myxine debueni Wisner & C. B. McMillan, 1995 (Magellan hagfish)
 Myxine fernholmi Wisner & C. B. McMillan, 1995 (Falkland Islands hagfish)
 Myxine formosana H. K. Mok & C. H. Kuo, 2001 (Formosa hagfish)
 Myxine garmani D. S. Jordan & Snyder, 1901 (Garman's hagfish)
 Myxine glutinosa Linnaeus, 1758 (Atlantic hagfish)
Myxine greggi 
 Myxine hubbsi Wisner & C. B. McMillan, 1995 (Hubbs' hagfish)
 Myxine hubbsoides Wisner & C. B. McMillan, 1995
 Myxine ios Fernholm, 1981 (white-headed hagfish)
 Myxine jespersenae Møller, Feld, I. H. Poulsen, Thomsen & Thormar, 2005 (Jespersen's hagfish)
 Myxine knappi Wisner & C. B. McMillan, 1995) (Knapp's hagfish)
 Myxine kuoi H. K. Mok, 2002 (Kuo's hagfish)
 Myxine limosa Girard, 1859 (Girard's Atlantic hagfish)
Myxine martinii 
Myxine mccoskeri Wisner & C. B. McMillan, 1995 (McCosker's hagfish)
 Myxine mcmillanae Hensley, 1991 (Caribbean hagfish)
 Myxine paucidens Regan, 1913 (Hyalonema hagfish)
 Myxine pequenoi Wisner & C. B. McMillan, 1995 (Chilean hagfish)
Myxine phantasma 
Myxine robinsora Wisner & C. B. McMillan, 1995 (Wisner's Caribbean hagfish)
 Myxine sotoi Mincarone, 2001 (Brazilian hagfish)

References

Myxinidae
Jawless fish genera
Taxa named by Carl Linnaeus